RZ Piscium (or RZ Psc) is a UX Orionis type variable star  away, in the constellation Pisces. Over the years, the star has been found to brighten and dim erratically, dimming by as much as a tenth of its usual luminosity. RZ Piscium  has been found to emit large amounts of infrared radiation, suggesting the presence of a substantial mass of gas and dust orbiting the star, possibly from a "disrupted planet".

Disrupted planet
Because of the infrared excess and rapid light variations, astronomers conclude that:

According to astronomer Ben Zuckerman:

Observations

In 2017, RZ Piscium was studied using the XMM-Newton satellite, the Shane 3-meter telescope at Lick Observatory in California and the 10-meter Keck I telescope at W. M. Keck Observatory in Hawaii. The temperature of the star was found to be about the same as the Sun. Further, the star was found to produce about a thousand times more x-rays than the Sun, suggesting that the star is relatively young. On the other hand, RZ Piscium was found to contain a relatively small amount of surface lithium, which suggests the star is between 30 − 50 million years old; this is somewhat "old" for a star with so much circumstellar dust. Most young stars that are as dusty as RZ Piscium may be producing planets, but given its relatively advanced age, RZ Piscium may be destroying and consuming its planets instead.

In 2020, the red dwarf companion with the mass of 0.12 Solar mass was detected on the projected separation of the 23 AU from the primary star. The incandescence of the companion star thus make up about one third of excess infrared emission previously attributed to the dust.

See also 
 List of stars that have unusual dimming periods

References

External links
 , star with unusual light fluctuations (21 December 2017).
 , a presentation by Tabetha S. Boyajian
 , a presentation by Issac Arthur

Pisces (constellation)
Planetary rings
2017 in science
Piscium, RZ
J01094205+2757020
K-type subgiants
Herbig Ae/Be stars